KCVR (1570 kHz) is a commercial AM radio station licensed to Lodi, California. It airs Punjabi language programming and is owned by Punjabi American Media, LLC.  Punjabi is a language spoken in parts of India and Pakistan. KCVR's programming is simulcast on KIID 1470 AM in Sacramento, KWRU 1300 AM in Fresno, KLHC 1350 AM in Bakersfield and KOBO 1450 AM in Yuba City.

KCVR is powered at 5,000 watts by day, reducing power to 500 watts at night to avoid interfering with other stations on AM 1570. It uses a directional antenna at all times. The transmitter is on Alpine Road in Lodi. The station covers the Stockton metropolitan area and the daytime signal covers parts of the Sacramento metropolitan area.

History
In 1946, KCVR signed on the air. It was originally owned by Central Valley Radio, whose initials gave the station its call sign. At first, KCVR was a daytimer, powered at 500 watts and required to go off the air at sunset.

On September 16, 1948, the Federal Communications Commission authorized KCVR to increase its power to 1,000 watts but still broadcasting only in the daytime.

In the 1960s, KCVR adopted a Spanish language format, largely of Regional Mexican music. Jose Tapia was the station's principal personality from 1955 until 1963. In 1966, Spanish language personalities on KCVR included Tapia (who hosted "Asi Es Mi Tierra" five hours per week), Augie Soto (who hosted "Melodias del Valle" from 3 to 5 p.m. weekdays), Alex Vasquez (who hosted "Programa Latino America"), Carlos Montano (who hosted "La Hora del Hogar"), Tony Zuniga (who hosted "Atarceder Musical" and Tina Rodriguez (who hosted "Sobremesa Musical" on weekdays from 1 to 2 p.m. and "Rincon Norteno" from 2 to 3 p.m. weekdays).

On June 3, 2015, KCVR changed the format to Spanish contemporary hit radio, simulcasting KCVR-FM 98.9 MHz licensed to Columbia, California. Effective August 6, 2020, KCVR was acquired by Punjabi American Media, as part of a network of six Central California AM stations broadcasting Punjabi language programming.

References

Previous logo

External links

CVR (AM)
CVR (AM)
Radio stations established in 1946
1946 establishments in California
Entravision Communications stations
Regional Mexican radio stations in the United States